This is a list of landmarks in Puerto Rico. These are either tourist attractions, places of interest or famous landmarks located in Puerto Rico. The list is divided among the 78 municipalities of the island.

Adjuntas

 Adjuntas Pueblo and its central plaza
 Casa Pueblo
 Castillo de los Niños
 El Gigante Dormido
 Garzas Lake
 Guilarte State Forest
 Las Cabañas Bridge
 Villa Sotomayor

Aguada

 Aguada Museum and Historic Railway Station
 Aguada Pueblo and its main plaza
 Aguada transmission station, the tallest man-made structure in Puerto Rico
 Christopher Columbus Landing Monument and Cross
 Church of San Francisco de Asís
 Coloso Bridge
 Coloso Sugar Cane Refinery
 Espinar Beach
 Pico Piedra Beach
 The Aguada Pyramid

Aguadilla

 Aguadilla Pueblo and its plazas
 Aguadilla Ice Skating Arena
 Aguadilla Museum of Art in the former District Courthouse
 Cardona Residence
 Iglesia de San Carlos Borromeo
 Crash Boat Beach
 Cristobal Colón Park
 El Parterre
 Fisherman's Monument
 Fuerte de la Concepción
 Gas Chambers Beach
 Las Cascadas Water Park
 López Residence
 Punta Borinquen and its lighthouse
 Punta Borinquen Golf Course
 Rafael Hernández Monument
 Rompeolas Beach
 Surfer's Beach
 Survival Beach

Aguas Buenas

 Aguas Buenas Cave and Caverns System Natural Reserve
 Aguas Buenas Pueblo and its main plaza
 El Mirador Walkway
 Hacienda Cascada
 La Charca Recreational Center
 Parque de Bombas Maximiliano Merced
 Monte La Tiza

Aibonito

 Aibonito Pueblo and its main plaza
 Asomante Memorial and historic battleground
 Church San José of Aibonito
 El Mirador overlook
 Federico Degetau House Museum
 Festival of Flowers (June)
 Historic Moscoso Pharmacy of Aibonito
 La Piedra de Degetau park and scenic area
 Old Encanto Theater
 San Cristóbal Canyon

Añasco

 Añasco Pueblo and its main plaza
 Añasco Beach
 Church of San Antonio Abad
 Hacienda La Eugenia
 Diego Salcedo Fountain
 Salto de la Encantada waterfall
 Tres Hermanos Beach
 Villa Pesquera

Arecibo

 Historic Arecibo Pueblo
 Arecibo City Hall
 Arecibo Harbor
 Arecibo Observatory, site of the former Arecibo Telescope
 Birth of the New World, tallest statue in America
 Cambalache State Forest
 Caño Tiburones swamp
 Cathedral of San Felipe Apóstol
 Cueva Ventana
 Dos Bocas Lake
 El Indio Cave and petroglyphs
 Las Tunas Beach
 Los Morillos Beach
 Los Negritos Beach
 Manuel "Petaca" Iguina Coliseum
 Museum of Art and History of Arecibo
 Historic Oliver Building
 Paseo Víctor Rojas
 Poza del Obispo Beach
 Punta Morrillos Lighthouse
 Trina Padilla de Sanz House Museum

Arroyo

 Arroyo Pueblo and its main plaza
 Arroyo Surfing Park
 Enrique Huyke Monument
 Hacienda La Cora
 Las Palmas Beach
 Malecón Paseo Las Américas
 Old Customs House of Arroyo
 Punta de las Figuras Light
 Punta Guilarte Beach
 Samuel Morse Monument
 Train of the South

Barceloneta

 Barceloneta Pueblo and its plazas
 Barceloneta Cultural Center
 Cambalache State Forest
 Caño Tiburones swamp
 Hacienda Marqués de la Esperanza Ruins
 La Monserrate Refinery Ruins
 Las Criollas Beach
 Machuca Beach, black sand beach
 Malecón de la Boca
 Old Pier of Barceloneta
 Palmas Altas Beach
 Sixto Escobar Museum

Barranquitas

 Barranquitas Pueblo and historic plaza
 Camp Morton Recreation Area
 El Cortijo Castle
 Luis Muñoz Rivera Birthplace house and museum
 Muñoz Rivera family mausoleum
 San Cristóbal Canyon

Bayamón

 Bayamón City Hall
 Bayamón Central Park
 Bayamón River Lineal Park
 Braulio Castillo Theater
 Downtown Bayamón and its plaza
 Charco Prieto waterfall and natural pool
 Francisco Oller Museum
 Casa y Museo José Celso Barbosa
 Juan Ramón Loubriel Stadium
 Julio Enrique Monagas Park
 Manatee Conservation Center
 Parque de las Ciencias
 Plaza del Sol
 Plaza Rio Hondo
 Ron Del Barrilito rum distillery in Hacienda Santa Ana
 Rubén Rodríguez Coliseum

Cabo Rojo

 Cabo Rojo Pueblo and its plaza
 Boquerón village and beach
 Boquerón State Forest
 Buyé Beach
 Cabo Rojo National Natural Landmark
 Cabo Rojo National Wildlife Refuge
 Club Deportivo del Oeste Marina and Nautical Club
 Cofresí Cave
 El Combate Beach
 Isla de Ratones
 Joyuda fishing village and beach
 Joyuda Lagoon
 Los Morrillos Lighthouse
 Old Excelsior Theater
 Playa Sucia
 Puerta Real Beach
 Punta Arenas Beach
 San Miguel Arcángel Church

Caguas

 Downtown Caguas and its plaza
 Caguas Cathedral
  Caguas City Hall and History Museum
 Caguas Museum of Art
 Caguas Museum of Folk Arts
 Caguas Tobacco Museum
 Carite State Forest
 First Baptist Church of Caguas
 Hacienda Catalina Ruins in Las Catalinas Mall
 La India Dormida
 Puente No. 6, a historic bridge
 William Miranda Marín Botanical and Cultural Garden

Camuy

 Camuy Pueblo and its plaza
 Camuy Caves
 Camuy History Museum
 Camuy River Boardwalk
 Hacienda Morell
 Peñon Brussi Beach
 The Stone Church
 Tres Pueblos Sinkhole

Canóvanas

 Canóvanas Pueblo and its plaza
 Camarero Racetrack
 Canóvanas Sugar Mill Ruins
 El Español Bridge
 Jesús T. Piñero House
 The Old Ceiba Tree

Carolina

 Downtown Carolina and its main plaza
 Buena Vista Ruins
 Carolina municipal beach
 Chabad of Puerto Rico Orthodox synagogue
 Isla Verde hotel and beach area
 Julia de Burgos Park
 Loíza River Boardwalk
 Luis Muñoz Marín International Airport
 Plaza Carolina
 Roberto Clemente Stadium and Sports City

Cataño

 Downtown Cataño and its plaza
 Bacardi Cathedral of Rum
 Cataño Boardwalk

Cayey

 Cayey Pueblo and its main plaza
 Arenas Bridge
 Carite State Forest
 Cayey Hall of Fame and Sports
 Guavate and its lechoneras
 Juana Rodríguez Morales House
 La Liendre Bridge
 Monumento al Jíbaro Puertorriqueño with views of Cerro Las Tetas
 Monument to the Three Magi
 Pedro Montañez Municipal Stadium
 Río Matón Bridge
 University of Puerto Rico at Cayey Museum

Ceiba

 Ceiba Pueblo and its plaza
 Medio Mundo Beach
 Roosevelt Roads Naval Station

Ciales

 Ciales Pueblo and its main plaza
 Ciales Museum of Coffee
 Corretjer Museum and Library
 Doña Juana Falls
 Hacienda Carvajal
 Hacienda Negrón
 Juan Antonio Corretjer Lineal Park
 Las Archillas Cave
 Las Golondrinas Cave
 Manatí Bridge
 Toro Negro State Forest

Cidra

 Cidra Pueblo and its main plaza
 Hamacas Bridge
 Iberia Theater
 Lago de Cidra Recreation Area
 Parque del Niño
 Perico Waterfall

Coamo

 Baños de Coamo, historic warm springs
 Coamo Historic Museum
 Coamo Pueblo and its historic plaza
 Church San Blas de Illescas of Coamo
 Ermita Nuestra Señora de la Valvanera
 Las Calabazas Bridge
 Picó Hill overlook

Comerío

 Comerío Pueblo and its main plaza
 El Salto Hydroelectric Dams
 La Mora Cave
 La Tiza Hill
 Media Luna Recreation Park

Corozal

 Cibuco Historical Center
 Corozal Pueblo and its main plaza
 El Balalaika historic general store
 El Jíbaro Recreation Center
 El Rancho Recreation Center
 Mavilla Bridge
 San Rafael de Corozal Theater

Culebra

 Brava Beach
 Cayo Luis Peña
 Culebra Bioluminiscent Bay
 Culebra National Wildlife Refuge
 Culebra Town
 Culebrita
 Ensenada Honda
 Flamenco Beach
 Larga Beach
 Las Vacas Beach
 Punta Soldado Beach
 Resaca Beach
 Tamarindo Beach
 Tortuga Beach
 Zoni Beach

Dorado

 Casa del Rey Museum
 Dorado Beach Hotel and Golf Club
 Dorado Pueblo and its main plaza
 Juan Boria Theatre
 Manuel Nolo Morales Beach
 Ojo del Buey Park
 Sanctuary Christ of the Reconciliation

Fajardo

 Cape San Juan Lighthouse and Nature Reserve
 Cayo Diablo
 Cayo Icacos
 Cordillera Keys Barrier Reef Nature Reserve
 El Conquistador Resort
 Fajardo Pueblo and its plaza
 Hipolito Robles Sports Complex
 Isla Palomino and Palominito
 Isleta Marina
 Laguna Grande Bioluminescent Bay
 Las Croabas Natural Reserve
 Las Croabas Recreational Park
 Old Fajardo Sugar Cane Refinery
 Old US Customs House
 Port of Fajardo
 Puerto Del Rey Marina
 Seven Seas Beach

Florida

 Pueblo de Florida
 Juana Gómez Cave
 Miró Cave
 Rio Encantado Caves
 Román Cave

Guánica

 Cayos de Caña Gorda and Gilligan's Island
 Central Guánica Sugarcane Refinery
 Copamarina Beach Resort & Spa
 Fort Caprón ruins
 Hacienda Santa Rita
 Guánica Lighthouse
 Guánica Museum of Art and History
 Guánica Pueblo and its main plaza
 Guánica State Forest
 Malecón and Monument to the US Military Landing
 Manglillo Beach
 Punta de Brea Beach
 Punta Jorobao Beach
 Santa Beach
 Serra Beach

Guayama

 Aguirre State Forest
 Calimano Theater
 Carite Lake
 Carite State Forest
 Cautiño House Museum
 Central Aguirre Historic District
 El Legado Golf Resort
 Guayama Convention Center
 Guayama First Methodist Church
 Guayama Fishing Club and Marina
 Historic Guayama Pueblo
 Historic Vives Sugar Mill
 Jobos Bay National Estuarine Research Reserve
 Las Limas Natural Reserve and Butterfly House
 Melania Lake and Park
 Pozuelo Beach
 Rodeo Beach
 San Antonio de Padua Church

Guayanilla

 Chorro de Oro Waterfall
 Convento Caves
 Emajagua Beach
 Guánica State Forest
 Guayanilla Pueblo and its main plaza
 Guilarte State Forest
 La Ventana Beach
 Rufina Sugarcane Refinery Ruins
 Tamarino Beach

Guaynabo

 Caparra Archaeological Site
 Caribe Recreational Center
 Fort Buchanan
 Guaynabo Center for Performing Arts
 Guaynabo Museum of Sports
 Downtown Guaynabo and its main plaza
 La Marquesa Forest Park
 Mario Morales Coliseum
 Museum of Transportation of Puerto Rico
 San Patricio Plaza

Gurabo

 Ana G. Méndez University Museum
 Cofresí Park
 Gurabo Pueblo and its main plaza
 Gurabo Historic Stairways
 Hacienda Mirador

Hatillo

 Bayaney Historic Refinery
 Church of Our Lady of Mount Carmel
 Francisco "Pancho" Deida Méndez Coliseum
 Hacienda Santa Rosa Ruins
 Hatillo Pueblo and its main plaza
 José Antonio Monrouzeau Theater
 Juan Carmelo "Tito" Rodríguez Donate Stadium
 La Marina Beach
 Paseo del Carmen
 Plaza del Norte
 Santa Rosa Mill
 Sardinera Beach

Hormigueros

 Basílica Menor de la Virgen de Monserrate
 Birán Recreational Farm
 Eureka Sugar Refinery
 Hormigueros Pueblo and its main plaza

Humacao

 Buena Vista Beach
 Casa Roig Museum
 El Morrillo Beach
 Humacao Cathedral
 Humacao Pueblo and its main plaza
 Palmas del Mar Resort and Beach
 Punta Candelero Beach
 Punta Santiago Nature Reserve
 Punta Santiago village and beach
 University of Puerto Rico at Humacao Astronomical Observatory

Isabela

 El Pozo Brujo
 Guajataca State Forest
 Guajataca Tunnel and beach
 Hermitage of San Antonio de Padua de la Tuna
 Isabela Museum of Photography
 Isabela Pueblo and its main plaza
 Jobos Beach
 La Cara del Indio
 La Pocita de las Golondrinas Beach
 La Princesa Beach and Blow Hole
 Las Golondrinas Beach
 Middles Beach
 Montones Beach
 Pozo de Jacinto
 Punta Sandina Tidal Pools
 San Antonio de la Tuna Museum
 Shacks Beach
 Shore Island Beach

Jayuya

 Cerro de Punta
 Cerro Rosa
 Hacienda San Pedro
 Jayuya Pueblo and its main plaza
 Los Tres Picachos
 Los Tres Picachos State Forest
 Monte Jayuya
 Nemesio Canales House and El Cemí Museum
 Piedra Escrita petroglyphs and natural pool
 Toro Negro State Forest

Juana Díaz

 Juana Díaz Pueblo and its main plaza
 Lucero Cave
 Monument and Museum to the Juana Díaz Three Wise Kings

Juncos

 El Tenedor Restaurant
 Juncos Pueblo and its main plaza
 Juncos Sugarcane Mill Ruins
 Junqueño Theater
 The Old Tobacco Farm

Lajas

 Boquerón State Forest
 Caracoles Beach
 Isla Magueyes
 Isla Mata la Gata
 La Parguera
 Laguna Cartagena National Wildlife Refuge
 Lajas Pueblo and its main plaza
 Old Lajas Silver Mines
 Puerto Rico Alien Route
 Rosada Beach

Lares

 Castañer Pueblo and its former city hall
 El Jíbaro Park
 Hacienda Collazo
 Hacienda El Porvenir
 Hacienda Lealtad
 Lares Ice Cream Parlor
 Lares Pueblo and its main plaza
 Mariana Bracetti Overlook

Las Marías

 Barrietos Cave
 Las Marías Pueblo and its main plaza
 Paradise Camping Coffee Farm

Las Piedras

 Cueva del Indio Archaeological Site
 Francisco Negrón Park
 El Toro Wilderness
 Las Piedras Historic Museum
 Las Piedras Pueblo and its main plaza

Loíza

 Aviones Beach
 Church of the Holy Spirit and San Patricio
 Julia de Burgos Park
 Loíza Pueblo and its main plaza
 Piñones village and food kiosks
 Piñones State Forest
 Vacía Talega Beach

Luquillo

 El Yunque National Forest
 Fortuna Beach
 La Bandera Beach
 La Pared Beach
 Las Pailas Beach
 Luquillo Beach and its food kiosks
 Luquillo Pueblo and its main plaza
 Mameyes Beach
 Oceanview Boulevard and boardwalk

Manatí

 Hacienda La Esperanza
 Hyatt Place Hotel and Casino
 La Esperanza Beach
 Las Golondrinas Beach
 Los Tubos Beach
 Manatí Pueblo and its main plaza
 Mar Chiquita Beach
 New Manati Arena and Baseball Stadium
 Poza de las Mujeres

Maricao

 Bambúa Recreational Center
 Curet Falls
 Hacienda Delicias
 Hacienda Juanita
 Maricao Fish Hatchery
 Maricao Pueblo and its main plaza
 Maricao State Forest

Maunabo

 Los Bohios Beach
 Los Pinos Beach
 Maunabo Pueblo and its main plaza
 Punta Tuna Beach
 Punta Tuna Lighthouse

Mayagüez

 Asilo de Pobres Building
 Baudilio Vega Berrios Cultural Center
 Boquilla Creek Wildlife Reserve
 India Beer Brewery
 Desecheo National Wildlife Refuge
 Downtown Mayagüez and historic site
 Dr. Juan A. Rivero Zoo
 E. Franco & Co. Bakery
 Edificio José de Diego
 Gómez Residence
 Mayagüez City Hall
 Mayagüez Resort & Casino
 Papalaya
 Parque del Litoral
 Plaza Colón
 Rex Cream's Ice Cream
 RUM Planetarium
 Teatro Yagüez
 University of Puerto Rico at Mayagüez
 U.S. Post Office and Courthouse

Moca

 Enrique Laguerre House
 Moca Pueblo and its main plaza
 Mundillo Museum
 Palacete Los Moreau

Morovis

 Las Cabachuelas Cave
 La Patria Bakery
 Morovis National Cemetery
 Morovis Pueblo and its main plaza

Naguabo

 Castillo Villa del Mar
 Cayo Algodones
 Charco El Hippie
 El Yunque National Forest
 Húcares Waterfront and seafood restaurants
 Naguabo Beach
 Naguabo Pueblo and its main plaza
 Punta Lima Beach
 Ramón Rivero "Diplo" Monument

Naranjito

 Jesús Izcoa Moure Bridge
 La Plata Lake
 Naranjito Pueblo and its main plaza

Orocovis

 Cerro La Guaira Park
 Las Cabañas restaurants
 Matrullas Lake
 Orocovis Pueblo and its main plaza
 Toro Negro Rain Forest
 Toro Verde Nature Adventure Park
 Villalba-Orocovis Overlook

Patillas

 Charco Azul in Carite State Forest
 Escondida Beach
 Guardarraya Beach
 Patillas Lake
 Patillas Pueblo and its main plaza
 Villa Pesquera Beach

Peñuelas

 Guilarte State Forest
 La Soplaera falls and natural pool
 Peñuelas Museum of Art and History
 Peñuelas Pueblo and its main plaza

Ponce

Banks

 Banco de Ponce
 Banco Crédito y Ahorro Ponceño

Beaches

 Caja de Muertos
 El Tuque
 La Guancha

Cemeteries

 Cementerio Católico San Vicente de Paul
 Panteón Nacional Román Baldorioty de Castro
 Cementerio Civil de Ponce

Churches

 Catedral de Nuestra Señora de Guadalupe
 Iglesia de la Santísima Trinidad
 Iglesia Metodista Unida de la Playa de Ponce
 Primera Iglesia Metodista Unida de Ponce

Forests

 Cerrillos State Forest
 Toro Negro State Forest

Historic homes

 Calle 25 de Enero
 Casa Fernando Luis Toro
 Casa Font-Ubides
 Casa Oppenheimer
 Casa Paoli
 Casa Salazar-Candal
 Casa Serralles
 Casa Rosita Serrallés
 Casa Wiechers-Villaronga
 Castillo Serrallés
 Residencia Armstrong-Poventud
 Residencia Rosaly-Batiz
 Residencia Subirá

Hotels

 Hotel Fox Delicias
 Hotel Ponce Intercontinental
 Hotel Melia
 Hotel Ponce Ramada

Industries and companies

 Bolera Caribe
 Café Rico
 Destilería Serrallés
 Industrias Vassallo
 King's Cream
 Ponce Cement, Inc.
 Puerto Rico Iron Works
 Rovira Biscuits Corporation

Islands

 Caja de Muertos
 Isla Cardona
 Isla de Gatas
 Isla de Jueyes
 Isla de Ratones
 Isla del Frío
 Morrillito

Lighthouses

 Faro de la Isla de Caja de Muertos
 Faro del Puerto de Ponce

Marinas

 Club Nautico de Ponce
 Villa Pesquera

Monuments

 Monumento a la abolición de la exclavitud
 Monumento a los heroes de El Polvorín (obelisco)
 Monumento a los heroes de El Polvorín (tumba)

Museums

 Centro Ceremonial Indígena de Tibes
 Hacienda Buena Vista
 Museo Castillo Serrallés
 Museo de Arte de Ponce
 Museo de la Arquitectura Ponceña
 Museo de la Historia de Ponce
 Museo de la Masacre de Ponce
 Museo de la Música Puertorriqueña
 Museo del Autonomismo Puertorriqueño
 Museo Francisco "Pancho" Coimbre
 Parque de Bombas

Parks

 Parque de la Abolición
 Parque de la Ceiba
 Parque del Retiro
 Parque del Tricentenario
 Parque Ecológico Urbano
 Parque Familiar Julio Enrique Monagas
 Parque Lineal Veredas del Labrador
 Parque Luis A. Wito Morales
 Parque Pedro Albizu Campos
 Parque Urbano Dora Colón Clavell
 Plaza Degetau
 Plaza Las Delicias
 Plaza Muñoz Rivera

Schools and colleges

 Colegio Ponceño
 Colegio San Conrado
 Ponce High School
 Ponce School of Medicine
 Pontificia Universidad Católica de Puerto Rico
 Universidad de Puerto Rico en Ponce
 Universidad Interamericana en Ponce

Sports venues

 Auditorio Juan Pachín Vicéns
 Campo Atlético Charles H. Terry
 Ciudad Deportiva Millito Navarro
 Club Náutico de Ponce
 Estadio Francisco Montaner

Shopping plazas

 Fox Delicias Mall
 Plaza del Mercado de Ponce
 Plaza del Caribe
 Plaza Juan Ponce de León
 Centro del Sur Mall

Theaters

 Teatro Fox Delicias
 Teatro La Perla

Visitor attractions

 Antiguo Casino de Ponce
 Antiguo Cuartel Militar Español de Ponce
 Antiguo Hospital Militar Español de Ponce
 Biblioteca Municipal de Ponce
 Centro Cultural de Ponce Carmen Solá de Pereira
 Centro de Convenciones de Ponce
 Complejo Recreativo y Cultural La Guancha
 Cruceta del Vigía
 Letras de Ponce
 Luis A. Ferré United States Courthouse and Post Office Building
 Paseo Atocha
 Paseo Tablado La Guancha
 Ponce City Hall
 Ponce YMCA Building
 United States Customs House
 Zona Historica de Ponce

Quebradillas

 Blanco Historic Bridge
 Guajataca Beach and tunnel
 Guajataca Lake
 Guajataca State Forest
 Liberty Theater
 Puerto Hermina Beach and ruins
 Quebradillas Pueblo and its main plaza

Rincón

 Córcega Beach
 Domes Beach
 Marias Beach
 Pools Beach
 Punta Higuero Lighthouse
 Rincón Pueblo and its main plaza
 Rincón Beach
 Sandy Beach
 Steps Beach
 Tres Palmas Beach
 whale watching viewpoints

Río Grande

 Coco Beach
 El Yunque National Forest
 Grand Rio Mar Resort and Beach
 Hyatt Regency Grand Reserve
 Las Picúas
 Río Grande Pueblo and its main plaza
 St. Regis Bahía Beach Resort & Golf Club

Sabana Grande

 Hacienda San Francisco
 Sabana Grande Masonic Cemetery
 Sabana Grande Pueblo and its main plaza
 Sanctuary of the Virgin of the Rosary of the Well
 Susúa State Forest

Salinas

 Albergue Olímpico
 Campamento Santiago
 Central Aguirre Historic District
 Cerro Las Tetas
 Salinas Beach and fishing village
 Salinas Pueblo and its main plaza

San Germán

 Church of San Germán de Auxerre
 Interamerican University Historic Campus
 La Botica Pharmacy Museum
 Lola Rodríguez de Tió Museum
 Porta Coeli Church
 Ramírez de Arrellano y Rossell Museum
 San Germán Historic District
 San Germán Underground

San Juan

Beaches

 Condado Beach
 El Escambrón Beach
 Ocean Park Beach
 Playita del Condado

Bridges

 Dos Hermanos Bridge
 General Norzagaray Bridge
 Martín Peña Bridge
 Río Piedras Bridge
 San Antonio Railroad Bridge
 Teodoro Moscoso Bridge

Castles and fortresses

 Castillo San Cristóbal
 Castillo San Felipe del Morro
 City Walls of San Juan
 Fortín de San Gerónimo
 Fortín San Antonio
 La Fortaleza
 Línea Avanzada Fortress
 Polvorín de Miraflores

Cemeteries

 Santa María Magdalena de Pazzis Cemetery

Churches

 Capilla del Cristo
 Church and Convent of San Agustín
 Church of San Mateo de Cangrejos of Santurce
 Church of San Vicente de Paul
 Church of Saint Francis of Assisi, San Juan
 Episcopal Cathedral of St. John the Baptist
 Nuestra Señora de Lourdes Chapel
 Shaare Tzadik Synagogue
 Sagrado Corazon Church
 San José Church
 San Juan Cathedral
 San Juan Puerto Rico Temple
 Santa Ana Church
 Stella-Maris Catholic Church
 Temple Beth Shalom

Government buildings

 Capitol of Puerto Rico
 Clemente Ruiz Nazario United States Courthouse
 Jose V. Toledo Federal Building and United States Courthouse
 San Juan City Hall
 Supreme Court Building
 U.S. Customs House

Historic districts

 La Perla
 La Placita de Santurce
 Miramar
 Old San Juan
 Puerta de Tierra Historic District
 Río Piedras Pueblo
 San Juan Waterworks
 Santurce Historic District

Hotels

 Caribe Hilton Hotel
 Condado Vanderbilt Hotel
 Hotel El Convento
 La Concha Renaissance San Juan Resort
 Normandie Hotel
 San Juan Marriott Resort & Stellaris Casino

Houses

 Casa de España
 Casa Dra. Concha Melendez Ramirez
 Casa Vigil
 Edificio Aboy
 Edificio Comunidad de Orgullo Gay de Puerto Rico
 Edificio del Valle
 Edificio Patio Español
 Edificio Victory Garden
 El Falansterio de Puerta de Tierra
 Figueroa Apartments Building
 Henry Klumb House
 House at 659 Concordia Street
 House at 659 La Paz Street
 House at 663 La Paz Street
 House at 665 McKinley Street
 La Giralda
 Miami Building
 Residencia Aboy-Lompré
 Residencia Luis Muñoz Marín
 Villa Victoria

Libraries

 Archivo General de Puerto Rico
 Biblioteca Carnegie
 Institute of Puerto Rican Culture
 José M. Lázaro Library
 Puerto Rico National Library

Lighthouses

 El Morro Lighthouse

Monuments and memorials

 El Monumento de la Recordación

Museums

 Ateneo Puertorriqueño
 Ballajá Barracks
 Casa Blanca
 Casa Rosa
 Galería Casa Jefferson
 Galería Nacional
 Museo de Vida Silvestre
 Museum of Art of Puerto Rico
 Pablo Casals Museum
 Puerto Rico Museum of Contemporary Art
 San Juan Children's Museum
 San Juan Museum of Books
 University of Puerto Rico Museum of Art, History, and Anthropology

Music and event venues

 Coca-Cola Music Hall
 Conservatory of Music of Puerto Rico
 José Miguel Agrelot Coliseum
 La Ventana al Mar
 Luis A. Ferré Performing Arts Center
 Puerto Rico Convention Center
 Tito Puente Amphitheatre

Parks and gardens

 Condado Lagoon Park
 Luis Muñoz Marín Park
 Nuevo Milenio State Forest
 San Patricio State Forest
 San Juan Botanical Garden

Plazas and squares

 La Ventana al Mar
 Luis Muñoz Rivera Park
 Parque de las Palomas
 Paseo de La Princesa
 Plaza Antonia Quiñones
 Plaza Colón
 Plaza de Armas
 Plaza de la Catedral
 Plaza de San José
 Plaza del Quinto Centenario
 Plazuela de la Rogativa

Restaurants

 La Bombonera
 La Mallorquina
 Loverbar

Schools and universities

 Academia del Perpetuo Socorro
 Academia Interamericana Metro
 Academia Maria Reina
 Academia San Jorge
 Albizu University
 Center for Advanced Studies on Puerto Rico and the Caribbean
 Central High School
 Colegio de Arquitectos
 Colegio de las Madres del Sagrado Corazón
 Conservatory of Music of Puerto Rico
 Escuela Brambaugh
 Escuela Graduado José Celso Barbosa
 Escuela de Artes Plásticas y Diseño de Puerto Rico
 Mizpa Pentecostal University
 Polytechnic University of Puerto Rico
 Rafael Cordero Graded School
 Saint John's School
 School of Tropical Medicine
 Universidad del Sagrado Corazón
 University Gardens High School
 University High School
 University of Puerto Rico, Medical Sciences Campus
 University of Puerto Rico, Río Piedras Campus
 University of Puerto Rico School of Medicine

Shopping

 La Placita de Santurce
 Montehiedra Outlets
 Paseo de Diego
 Plaza Las Américas
 The Mall of San Juan
 T-Mobile District

Sports

 Hiram Bithorn Stadium
 José Miguel Agrelot Coliseum
 Old Country Club Stadium
 Roberto Clemente Coliseum
 San Juan Natatorium
 Sixto Escobar Stadium

Theaters

 Ambassador Theater
 Luis A. Ferré Performing Arts Center
 Teatro Tapia
 T-Mobile District

San Lorenzo

 Carite State Forest
 Montaña Santa Sanctuary
 Priscilla Flores Theater
 San Lorenzo Pueblo and its main plaza

San Sebastián

 Centro Agropecuario and farmers' market
 Church of St. Sebastian Martyr
 Doña Bisa House Museum
 Gozalandia Waterfalls
 Guajataca Lake
 Guajataka Scout Reservation
 Hacienda El Jibarito
 Hacienda La Fe
 Luis Aymat Cardona Coliseum
 San Sebastián Pueblo and its main plaza
 Veredas Sports Complex

Santa Isabel

 Aguirre State Forest
 Cortada Sugarcane Refinery Ruins
 El Malecón
 Hacienda Alomar Ruins
 Jauca Beach
 Racehorse stud farms
 Santa Isabel Pueblo and its main plaza

Toa Alta

 Old Bala de Cañón Tree
 Toa Alta Pueblo and its main plaza
 Villa Tropical Recreation Center

Toa Baja

 Constancia Sugarcane Refinery ruins
 San Juan de la Cruz Fortress
 Hacienda Santa Elena
 Isla de Cabras
 Palo Seco Thermoelectrical Power Station
 Punta Salinas Beach
 Toa Baja Pueblo and its main plaza

Trujillo Alto

 Carraízo Dam
 Loíza Lake
 Our Lady of Lourdes Shrine
 Trujillo Alto Pueblo and its main plaza

Utuado

 Caguana Indigenous Ceremonial Center
 Caonillas Lake
 Cerro Morales
 Church San Miguel Arcángel of Utuado
 Dos Bocas Dam
 El Saltillo Waterfall
 Dos Bocas Lake
 Río Abajo State Forest
 Utuado Pueblo and its main plaza

Vega Alta

 La Placita Güisín and Lin-Manuel Miranda Museum
 Vega Alta Pueblo and its main plaza
 Vega State Forest

Vega Baja

 Casa Alonso Museum
 El Trece Recreational Area
 Mar Bella Beach
 Melao Melao Artisan Center
 Melao Melao Sports Hall of Fame
 Tortuguero Lagoon and Nature Reserve
 Vega Baja House of Culture and Tourism
 Vega Baja Pueblo and its main plaza

Vieques

 Black Sand Beach
 Caracas Beach
 Conde de Mirasol Fort
 Esperanza Beach
 Hacienda Playa Grande
 Isabel II Town and its main plaza
 La Chiva Beach
 Pata Prieta Beach
 Plata Beach
 Puerto Ferro Archaeological Site
 Punta Arenas Beach
 Punta Mulas Lighthouse
 Sun Bay Beach
 Underground U.S. Navy Bunkers
 Vieques Bioluminiscent Bay
 Vieques National Wildlife Refuge
 Wreckage of the World War II Navy Destroyer USS Killen (DD-593)

Villalba

 Cerro Maravilla
 Doña Juana Falls
 Guayabal Lake
 Orocovis-Villalba Overlook
 Toa Vaca Lake
 Toro Negro State Forest
 Villalba Pueblo and its main plaza

Yabucoa

 Dead Dog Beach
 El Cocal Beach
 Guayanés Beach and pier
 Hacienda Santa Lucía Ruins
 Kyle Rembis Beach
 Roig Refinery Ruins
 Yabucoa Pueblo and its main plaza

Yauco

 Atolladora Beach
 Césari Mansion
 Chalet Amill
 Cuesta Los Judios
 Curet Hill
 Filardi House
 Franceschi Antongiorgi House
 Guilarte State Forest
 Hacienda Mireia
 Hijos de la Luz Historic Masonic Lodge
 Lake Luchetti and Wildlife Refuge
 Monte Membrillo
 Pico Rodadero
 Susúa State Forest
 Tozza Castle
 Volkyland Museum
 Yauco Pueblo and its main plaza
 Yaucromatic painted houses and mural

See also

 National Register of Historic Places listings in Puerto Rico
 List of lists of buildings and structures in Puerto Rico
 Tourism in Puerto Rico

Landmarks
Lists of landmarks
Landmarks
Landmarks